Álvaro Enrique Arzú Yrigoyen (14 March 1946 – 27 April 2018) was a Guatemalan politician and businessman who served as the 32nd President of Guatemala from 14 January 1996 until 14 January 2000. He was elected Mayor of Guatemala City on six occasions: in 1982, when he declined taking office because of a coup d'état; in 1986; in 2003, after serving as president; in 2007; in 2011, and in 2015, for a term that would see him die in office.

Early career
Born in Guatemala City, Arzú studied Social and Legal Sciences at Rafael Landívar University. In 1978 he became director of the Guatemalan Institute of Tourism (INGUAT); he occupied this position until 1981, when he was elected mayor of Guatemala City for the Guatemalan Christian Democracy (DCG) party. But in 1982 there was a military coup d'état and, although the elections were annulled, the military offered him to be the municipal intendent, which he declined. In 1986 he became mayor, after winning the election under the umbrella of the Plan for National Advancement civic committee.

In 1989 the civic committee became the National Advancement Party (PAN). Arzú was their presidential candidate for the 1990 elections, where he finished in fourth place with 17.3 percent of the vote. The winner, Jorge Serrano, appointed Arzú as minister for foreign affairs in 1991, but he resigned later that year in protest against Serrano's decision to normalize relations with Belize, over most of whose territory Guatemala has long-standing claims.

Presidency 
Arzú won the first round of the 1995 general elections in November, and then narrowly beat Alfonso Portillo of the Guatemalan Republican Front (FRG, Frente Republicano Guatemalteco) in the second round, which took place in January 1996. He obtained 51.2 percent of the vote.

The main achievement of Arzú's presidency was the signature of a peace accord with the guerrilla group Guatemalan National Revolutionary Unity, which ended Guatemala's 36-year-long civil war. The negotiations had been going on since 1990, and Arzú gave them a vital new impulse when he met the URNG in Mexico on 26 February 1996. A ceasefire followed on 20 March and various peace agreements were signed as the year progressed. On 12 December  an accord legalizing the URNG was signed in Madrid. On 18 December Congress passed a law giving a partial amnesty to the combatants, before the final accord for a firm and lasting peace was signed on 29 December.

As part of this peace accord, Arzú's government proposed a series of reforms to the Constitution of Guatemala; these reforms included disbanding the Presidential Guard, reducing the armed forces and recognizing the rights of indigenous communities. The proposed reforms were rejected in a referendum which took place in 1999.

Under Arzú's presidency, there was a significant investment in the country's infrastructure; particularly, the roads were improved, and electric and telephone coverage was increased. As part of this process, several public transportation and utility companies were privatized, which drew heavy criticism due to accusations of irregularities during the process. Some of these companies were the electric utility Empresa Eléctrica de Guatemala (EEGSA), the telephone service provider GUATEL, the national airline Aviateca, and the railway company FEGUA.

Among other challenges faced by Arzú's government were the murder of Archbishop Juan José Gerardi in 1998, which was later attributed to members of the Presidential Guard. Also, the destruction caused by Hurricane Mitch that same year, and the increase in the crime rate. Despite this, the gross domestic product grew about 3 percent annually and inflation was reduced to 5 percent.

Officers close to his government carried out assassinations of activists of social organizations.

Later career and death

After his presidential term, Arzú became a member of the Central American Parliament; he occupied this seat from 2000 to 2004. He was elected for a second term as mayor of Guatemala City in 2003, and was elected again in 2007, 2011, and 2015. His last term was set to finish in 2020.

During this period, Arzú established the Transmetro bus rapid transit system and worked on restoring the historical center of Guatemala City.

In his final years, 2017 and 2018, Arzú crusaded against the United Nations Commissioner of the International Commission against Impunity in Guatemala (CICIG), Iván Velásquez, and against the Attorney General, Thelma Aldana, openly accusing them of carrying out a slow coup d'état against President Morales under the cover of a fight against corruption and impunity. In the meantime, he had come under fire himself. On 27 April 2018, Arzú had a heart attack while playing golf in Guatemala City. He died in hospital later that day.

Personal life
Arzú had three children with his first wife, Sylvia García Granados, and two children with his second wife, Patricia Escobar. His son, Álvaro Arzú Escobar, was president of the Congress of Guatemala.

He was Guatemala's national squash rackets champion on several occasions.

Awards
 1996: UNESCO's Félix Houphouët-Boigny Peace Prize
 1997: During his presidency, the government of Guatemala was awarded Spain's Prince of Asturias Award for International Co-operation.
 Monseñor Leonidas Proaño Human Rights Prize (ALDHU)
 2005: Ranked third in the World Mayor contest.

References

External links
Biography and presidential tenure, by CIDOB Foundation
Profile citymayors
Arzú Alcalde 2007 mayoral campaign website

1946 births
2018 deaths
Presidents of Guatemala
Mayors of Guatemala City
Foreign ministers of Guatemala
People from Guatemala City
National Advancement Party politicians
Unionist Party (Guatemala) politicians
Guatemalan people of Spanish descent
Arzú family
Grand Crosses with Diamonds of the Order of the Sun of Peru